Martin Hála (born 24 March 1992) is a Czech football who plays as defender. He is currently free agent.

Honours 
SK Sigma Olomouc
 Czech Cup: 2011–12

References

External links 
 
 SK Sigma Olomouc profile
 

1992 births
Living people
Association football defenders
Czech footballers
Czech Republic youth international footballers
Czech Republic under-21 international footballers
SK Sigma Olomouc players
1. FC Slovácko players
FC Nitra players
SK Dynamo České Budějovice players
Slovak Super Liga players
Czech First League players
Expatriate footballers in Slovakia
Czech expatriate sportspeople in Slovakia